Zbigniew Paradowski (born 4 July 1932) is a Polish rower. He competed in the men's coxless four event at the 1956 Summer Olympics.

References

1932 births
Living people
People from Stowbtsy
People from Nowogródek Voivodeship (1919–1939)
Polish male rowers
Olympic rowers of Poland
Rowers at the 1956 Summer Olympics